Víctor Enrique Robles Brito (born May 19, 1997) is a Dominican professional baseball outfielder for the Washington Nationals of Major League Baseball (MLB). Robles signed with the Nationals as an international free agent in 2013. He made his MLB debut in 2017.

Career

Minor leagues
Robles signed with the Washington Nationals as an international free agent in 2013. He made his professional debut in 2014 in the Dominican Republic with the Dominican Summer League Nationals in the rookie-level Dominican Summer League, batting .313 with three home runs, 25 runs batted in (RBIs), and 26 stolen bases in 47 games. Robles started 2015 with the Gulf Coast Nationals in the rookie-level Gulf Coast League, playing in 23 games and hitting .370 with two home runs, 11 RBIs, and 12 stolen bases before he was promoted to the Auburn Doubledays in the Class A-Short Season New York-Penn League. He finished the season with Auburn, hitting .343 with two home runs, 16 RBIs, and 12 stolen bases for the Doubledays, giving him an overall batting average of .352 with four home runs, 27 RBIs, and 24 stolen bases for 2015.

Robles began the 2016 season with the Hagerstown Suns of the Class A South Atlantic League, and played in 64 games for the Suns, hitting .305 with five home runs, driving in 30 runs, and stealing 19 bases. He earned a promotion to the Potomac Nationals of the Class A-Advanced Carolina League, where he spent the rest of the season except for a brief rehabilitation stint with the Gulf Coast League Nationals after returning from the seven-day disabled list.  He went 3-for-20 (.150) in five games with the Gulf Coast League Nationals with a home run and an RBI, and in 41 games with Potomac he batted .262, hit three home runs, drove in 11 runs, and stole 18 bases. For the three teams combined, he hit .280 with nine home runs, 42 RBIs, and 37 stolen bases during 2016.

Following the trade that sent pitcher Lucas Giolito to the Chicago White Sox on December 7, 2016, Robles became the top-ranked prospect in the Washington Nationals' farm system. Baseball writer Jim Callis said that same month that he believed Robles could be considered the top overall prospect in baseball by the end of the 2017 season. In July 2017, MLB Pipeline listed Robles as the fifth-ranked prospect in baseball.

Robles began the 2017 season with Potomac. While with Potomac, he was named to the World team's roster for the 2017 All-Star Futures Game. On July 24, 2017, after Robles had played 77 games for Potomac, batting .289 with seven home runs, 33 RBIs, and 16 stolen bases, the Washington Nationals promoted him to the Harrisburg Senators of the Class AA Eastern League. Robles completed the minor-league season with Harrisburg, putting up a .324 batting average with an .883 on-base plus slugging percentage over 37 games with the Senators, hitting three home runs, driving in 14 runs, and stealing 11 bases.

2017
After the 2017 Eastern League season ended, the Washington Nationals promoted Robles to the major leagues for the first time on September 7, 2017. He became the youngest man to play in the 2017 Major League Baseball season as he made his debut that day against the Philadelphia Phillies, flying out to deep right field in a pinch-hit appearance. On September 10, 2017, Robles reached base safely for the first time in his major-league career after being hit by a pitch. Later in the game he tagged his first career major-league hit, a double off the scoreboard at Nationals Park in Washington, D.C., also driving in his first career major-league RBI, but he was called out at third base after he slid past the bag trying to stretch the hit into a triple. He finished the regular season with the Nationals having played in 13 games, batting 6-for-24 (.250) with a double and two triples and driving in four runs. He made the postseason playoff roster and appeared in two games in the 2017 National League Division Series, striking out in his only plate appearance but scoring one run.

After Washington lost the 2017 NLDS to the Chicago Cubs in five games, Robles played in the Arizona Fall League during the fall of 2017. In 13 games with the Mesa Solar Sox, he went 10-for-41 (.244), had a .389 on-base percentage, hit three home runs and a double, drove in seven runs, and stole seven bases. Playing for the East team, he was named the Most Valuable Player of the league's Fall Stars Game after going 1-for-3 with a walk, driving in a run, and scoring two runs in the game.

2018
Robles received an invitation to major-league spring training in 2018 and hit .188 in 21 spring-training games before the Nationals optioned him to the Syracuse Chiefs of the Class AAA International League, where he began the season. Ranked as the No. 6 prospect in baseball by MLB.com, he went 4-for-4 with a walk in his second game with Syracuse, driving in a run, stealing a base, and scoring two runs, including the go-ahead run in the ninth inning that gave the Chiefs a win; three of his hits came on the first pitch. He had gone 5-for-13 (.385) with one RBI for the Chiefs and was in his fourth game of the year on April 9 when he hyperextended his elbow while diving to make a catch in center field at Rochester while playing against the Rochester Red Wings. He was removed from the game. His injury did not require surgery, but it forced him to begin an extended stay on the disabled list. Robles started a rehab assignment with the Gulf Coast League Nationals on July 7, 2018, alongside fellow Chiefs outfielder Alejandro De Aza. For the 2018 season he batted .288/.348/.525 with three home runs, ten RBIs, and three stolen bases in five attempts in 59 at bats.

2019

In 2019 he batted .255/.326/.419 with 17 home runs, 65 RBIs, 25 hit by pitch (2nd in the NL), and 28 stolen bases (5th) in 37 attempts, and had the highest Soft Contact Percentage of all National League batters (24.2%), and the lowest Hard Contact Percentage of all National League batters, at 24.9%.  Balls he hit had an average exit velocity of 83.3 mph, in the slowest 1% in major league baseball. On defense in 2019, he had a 22 Defensive Runs Saved (DRS) rating, the best in the major leagues among center fielders. He led all major league center fielders in assists, with 12, and all major league outfielders in errors, with six. Because of his exceptional play, he was named as a finalist for the NL Gold Glove Award in center field, along with Harrison Bader and Lorenzo Cain, but Cain ended up winning the award.

2020
In 2020 he batted .220/.293/.315 with three home runs and 15 RBIs in 168 at bats, and had the lowest slugging percentage of all NL qualified batters. Balls he hit had an average exit velocity of 82.2 mph, in the slowest 1% in major league baseball. He was the seventh-youngest player in the NL.

2021
Robles struggled offensively in 2021, batting .203/.310/.295 with just two home runs and 19 RBIs in 315 at bats. Balls he hit had an average exit velocity of 84.1 mph, in the slowest 1% in major league baseball. On August 31, he was optioned to the Rochester Red Wings, the Nationals' minor league affiliate in the Triple-A East league.

2022
In 2022, Robles batted .224/.273/.311 in 366 at bats, and led the major leagues in bunt hits (with 10), as on defense he led NL center fielders in assists (7), range factor, and errors (6). Balls he hit had an average exit velocity of 84.6 mph, in the slowest 1% in major league baseball.

Scouting report
Robles in 2016 was considered a five-tool player, with speed as his best asset and power lagging somewhat behind the others. 

His speed in 2016 was compared to former Nationals shortstop Trea Turner, one of the fastest runners in Major League Baseball. In 2017 he sprint speed of 30.9 feet/second was tops in the league, but in 2022 it had dropped to 28.7 feet/second, which was 89th in the league. In 2022 his arm strength was an average 93.9 mph, which was in the top 3% in MLB.

References

External links

1997 births
Living people
Águilas Cibaeñas players
Auburn Doubledays players
Dominican Republic expatriate baseball players in the United States
Dominican Summer League Nationals players
Gulf Coast Nationals players
Hagerstown Suns players
Harrisburg Senators players
Major League Baseball players from the Dominican Republic
Major League Baseball outfielders
Potomac Nationals players
Syracuse Chiefs players
Washington Nationals players
People from Santo Domingo Province